Kanakangi (pronounced kanakāngi, meaning the golden bodied one) is a ragam in Carnatic music (musical scale of South Indian classical music). It is the 1st Melakarta rāgam in the 72 melakarta rāgam system of Carnatic music. It is called Kanakāmbari in the Muthuswami Dikshitar school.

Structure and Lakshana 

It is the 1st rāgam in the 1st chakra Indu. The mnemonic name is Indu-Pa. The mnemonic phrase is sa ra ga ma pa dha na. Its  structure (ascending and descending scale) has all shuddha swaras, as follows (see swaras in Carnatic music for details on below notation and terms):
: 
: 
(the notes are shuddha rishabham, shuddha gandharam, shuddha madhyamam, panchamam, shuddha dhaivatham, shuddha nishadham)

It is a sampurna rāgam – a rāgam that has all seven swaras (notes) and is often dubbed the shuddha scale, owing to its swarasthanas. It is the shuddha madhyamam equivalent of Salagam, which is the 37th melakarta.

Asampurna Melakarta 
Kanakāmbari is the 1st Melakarta in the original list compiled by Venkatamakhin. The notes used in the scale are the same, but the ascending scale is different. It is an audava-sampurna raga (5 notes in ascending scale, while full 7 are used in descending scale).
: 
:

Janya rāgams 
Kanakangi has a few janya ragams associated with it, of which Karnātaka shuddha sāveri and Lavangi (a recent addition to Carnatic music by Dr. M. Balamuralikrishna) are a little popular. 

See List of janya rāgams for a full list of Kanakangi's janyas.

Popular compositions 
Few compositions have been composed in this austere ragam of which some are as listed: 

kanakAmbari kAruNyAmRtalahari in rāgam KanakAmbari by Muthuswamy Dikshitar 

Sri Gananatham Bhajamyaham by Thyagaraja

Kanakangaka by Koteeswara Iyer - having composed a kriti in every melakarta raga in his magnum opus Kanda Ganamutham

Sreesa Putraya is a composition by Dr. M. Balamuralikrishna, is part of a series of compositions he created in every melakartha raga.

Varnam - Sri Ganeswaram from Janaka Raga Varna Manjari by Nallan Chakravarthy Murthy

Film Songs

Language:Tamil

Related rāgams 
This section covers the theoretical and scientific aspect of this rāgam.

Kanakangi's notes when shifted using Graha bhedam, yields Kamavardani. Graha bhedam is the step taken in keeping the relative note frequencies same, while shifting the shadjam to the next note in the rāgam.

Notes

References

Melakarta ragas